The 2015 Bangladesh–Arakan Army border clash took place on 25 August 2015 in the Bandarban District, near the Bangladesh–Myanmar border, when insurgents of the Arakan Army attacked members of Border Guards Bangladesh.

Background 
The Arakan Army is a Rakhine insurgent group mainly active in Rakhine State, Myanmar. Several other insurgent groups had already violently clashed with the Myanmar Armed Forces, known officially as the Tatmadaw, earlier in 2015. In the year prior, the Arakan Army had created a settlement near Myanmar's border with Bangladesh, and hundreds of insurgents from the group crossed into Bangladesh. The group was allegedly involved in the illegal drug trade in the region, an area of 8,080 acres in Remakri near the border with only six BGB outposts. Because the region is extremely remote and inaccessible from Bangladesh's side of the border, the Arakan Army managed to gain a foothold in the area.

Insurgent groups from Myanmar are often accused of looting the houses of indigenous peoples in Bangladesh, and fueling the drug trade in the border area. Members of the Arakan Army had often entered the locality of Thanchi on horses to replenish their food and materiel. On 14 July 2015, the BGB rescued two Myanmar soldiers captured by the Arakan Army.

On 25 August 2015, the BGB confiscated ten horses that were being used by the Arakan Army to transport supplies. Later that day the Arakan Army fired on a BGB patrol team. The Director General of the BGB suspected that the two incidents may have been linked, and that the latter may have been a reprisal attack.

Clash 
On 25 August 2015 at 09:30 am local time, fighting erupted near the village of Boro Modok in Thanchi. The Arakan Army attacked a ten-member BGB patrol team at Baramadak near the Sangu River, and the gunfire exchange continued for five hours. After learning about the incident, the BGB declared a state of emergency in the Bangladesh-Myanmar border. Authorities sent a unit of the BGB and two units of the Bangladesh Army as reinforcements to the area to conduct a coordinated operation.

On the same day, the Border Guards Bangladesh, the Bangladesh Army, and the Bangladesh Air Force launched a joint operation against the Arakan Army. Two units of army, one unit of the BGB, and one F-7 of the Bangladesh Air Force took part in the operation. Upon request from the Bangladeshi government, the Myanmar government sealed off their side of the border.

Initially, the Arakan Army had surrounded and laid siege to the BGB outpost in Boro Modok; however, the insurgents retreated from the area after Bangladeshi reinforcements arrived. Meanwhile, the Taitong Parha Army and the local police conducted joint raids for several hours between the mornings of 25 and 26 August 2015.

Aftermath 
Nayek Jakir Hossain of the Barakadam BOP was injured during the gunfight. He was rescued from the area and was sent to the Combined Military Hospital in Chittagong via helicopter. The Arakan Army lost two horses during the exchange of gunfire. According to locals sources, eight to twenty insurgents were injured.

The Bangladeshi joint forces later arrested a Burmese citizen and accomplice of the Arakan Army, Ong Owong Rakhain, in Rajsthali Upazila. He had Arakan Army uniforms, laptops, digital cameras, motorcycles and two horses in his possession. Two more people were arrested in the following days.

Home minister Asaduzzaman Khan, accompanied by BGB Director General Major general Aziz Ahmed, visited the site of the battle the next day. In a statement, the home minister of Bangladesh said that the joint operation would continue until the Arakan Army was neutralised.

See also 
 2001 Bangladesh–India border clashes

References 

Military history of Bangladesh
2010s in Bangladesh
Internal conflict in Myanmar
Bangladesh–Myanmar relations